Nitty Gritty may refer to:

Nitty Gritty (1957–1991), Jamaican reggae singer
The Nitty Gritty (song), a 1963 song recorded by Shirley Ellis
Nitty Gritty Dirt Band, an American country music band

See also
Nitty (disambiguation)